Juanita is a 1948 picture book written and illustrated by Leo Politi. The book explores Los Angeles' Latino Community's Olvera Street. The book was a recipient of a 1949 Caldecott Honor for its illustrations.

References

1948 children's books
American picture books
Caldecott Honor-winning works